Grand Jason Island (sometimes known as "Grand Island") is a small island located at , east of the Steeple Jason Island. It is a part of the Jason Islands in the Falkland Islands, and along with Steeple Jason it is one of the "Islas los Salvajes" in Spanish (the Jasons being divided into two groups in that language).

Wildlife
Grand Jason is a home to one of the largest colonies of black-browed albatrosses in the world.

Grand Jason and Steeple Jason Island, were bought by New York City philanthropist Michael Steinhardt in the 1990s, who later donated them to the Bronx Zoo based Wildlife Conservation Society.

Footnotes

References 
 BBC: Safe Haven for albatrosses (6 March 2002)
 

Jason Islands